The 2022 Ryazan Oblast gubernatorial election took place on 9–11 September 2022, on common election day. Acting Governor Pavel Malkov was elected to a full term.

Background
State Duma member Nikolay Lyubimov was appointed Governor of Ryazan Oblast in February 2017, replacing two-term Governor Oleg Kovalyov. In September 2017 Lyubimov won election for a full term with 80.16% of the vote.

Lyubimov, a Kaluga native, failed to make connections with local elite, and his governance was also described as problematic. On 10 May 2022 Nikolay Lyubimov asked for his resignation along four other governors, Rosstat Head Pavel Malkov was appointed acting Governor of Ryazan Oblast.

Due to the start of Russian special military operation in Ukraine in February 2022 and subsequent economic sanctions the cancellation and postponement of direct gubernatorial elections was proposed. The measure was even supported by A Just Russia leader Sergey Mironov. Eventually, on 10 June Ryazan Oblast Duma called the gubernatorial election for 11 September 2022.

Candidates
Only political parties can nominate candidates for gubernatorial election in Ryazan Oblast, self-nomination is not possible. However, candidates are not obliged to be members of the nominating party. Candidate for Governor of Ryazan Oblast should be a Russian citizen and at least 30 years old. Each candidate in order to be registered is required to collect at least 7% of signatures of members and heads of municipalities (199-208 signatures). Also gubernatorial candidates present 3 candidacies to the Federation Council and election winner later appoints one of the presented candidates.

Registered
 Pavel Malkov (United Russia), acting Governor of Ryazan Oblast, former Head of Rosstat (2018-2022)
 Grigory Parsentyev (SR-ZP), Member of Ryazan Oblast Duma
 Dmitry Repnikov (LDPR), Member of Ryazan City Duma
 Natalya Rubina (RPPSS), Member of Ryazan Oblast Duma
 Denis Sidorov (CPRF), Member of Ryazan Oblast Duma

Did not file
 Andrey Yeryomenko (Rodina), chairman of Rodina regional office

Eliminated in primary
 Inna Kalashnikova (United Russia), chair of Ryazan Oblast Union of Trade Unions
 Aleksandr Kopeykin (United Russia), chief trauma surgeon at Ryazan Oblast Hospital

Declined
 Dmitry Pankin (LDPR), Deputy Chairman of Ryazan City Duma

Candidates for Federation Council
Incumbent Senator Irina Petina was not renominated.
Pavel Malkov (United Russia):
Nikolay Lyubimov, former Governor of Ryazan Oblast (2017-2022)
Larisa Pastukhova, Provost of Russian State University for the Humanities
Olga Postnikova, nonprofit executive
Grigory Parsentyev (SR-ZP):
Aleksandr Averin, chairman of Zakhar Prilepin Guard regional office
Gennady Ignatov, retired Russian Airborne Forces officer
Andrey Semenyuk, Member of Ryazan City Duma
Dmitry Repnikov (LDPR):
Dmitry Borontov, Member of Ryazan Oblast Duma
Maksim Mustafin, Member of Ryazan Oblast Duma, acting coordinator of LDPR regional office
Yevgeny Myasin, Member of Ryazan City Duma
Natalya Rubina (RPPSS):
Sergey Borisov, surgeon, chief doctor at Lavmed clinic
Anatoly Pavlukhin, professor of criminal law at Academy of Law Management of the Federal Penal Service of Russia
Pavel Voronin, entrepreneur
Denis Sidorov (CPRF):
Dmitry Ivanichkin, Member of Ryazan City Duma, editor-in-chief of Priokskaya Pravda newspaper
Lilia Krivtsova, former Member of Ryazan City Duma (2013-2018)
Evelina Volkova, Member of Ryazan City Duma

Polls

Results

|- style="background-color:#E9E9E9;text-align:center;"
! style="text-align:left;" colspan=2| Candidate
! style="text-align:left;"| Party
! width="75"|Votes
! width="30"|%
|-
| style="background-color:;"|
| style="text-align:left;"| Pavel Malkov (incumbent)
| style="text-align:left;"| United Russia
| 320,976
| 84.55
|-
| style="background-color:|
| style="text-align:left;"| Denis Sidorov
| style="text-align:left;"| Communist Party
| 21,560
| 5.68
|-
| style="background-color:;"|
| style="text-align:left;"| Dmitry Repnikov
| style="text-align:left;"| Liberal Democratic Party
| 13,679
| 3.60
|-
| style="background-color:;"|
| style="text-align:left;"| Natalya Rubina
| style="text-align:left;"| Party of Pensioners
| 10,160
| 2.68
|-
| style="background-color:|
| style="text-align:left;"| Grigory Parsentyev
| style="text-align:left;"| A Just Russia — For Truth
| 8,395
| 2.21
|-
| style="text-align:left;" colspan="3"| Valid votes
| 374,770
| 98.73
|-
| style="text-align:left;" colspan="3"| Blank ballots
| 4,838
| 1.27
|- style="font-weight:bold"
| style="text-align:left;" colspan="3"| Total
| 379,609
| 100.00
|-
| style="background-color:#E9E9E9;" colspan="6"|
|-
| style="text-align:left;" colspan="3"| Turnout
| 379,609
| 42.92
|-
| style="text-align:left;" colspan="3"| Registered voters
| 884,553
| 100.00
|-
| colspan="5" style="background-color:#E9E9E9;"|
|- style="font-weight:bold"
| colspan="4" |Source:
|
|}

Former Governor Nikolay Lyubimov (United Russia) was appointed to the Federation Council, replacing incumbent Senator Irina Petina (Independent).

See also
2022 Russian gubernatorial elections

References

Ryazan Oblast
Ryazan Oblast
Politics of Ryazan Oblast